Konkona Sen Sharma (born 3 December 1979) is an Indian actress and filmmaker who works primarily in Hindi and Bengali films. She has received two National Film Awards and five Filmfare Awards in various categories and versions. The daughter of filmmakeractress Aparna Sen, Sen Sharma appears primarily in arthouse independent films, and her achievements in the genre have established her as one of the leading actresses of contemporary parallel cinema. She has also acted in mainstream films like Laaga Chunari Mein Daag for which too she has received awards.

Making her debut as a child artist in the film Indira (1983), Sharma debuted as an adult in the Bengali thriller Ek Je Aachhe Kanya (2000). She first gained attention with the English-language film Mr. and Mrs. Iyer (2002), which was directed by her mother, and received the National Film Award for Best Actress for her performance. Her appearance in the drama Page 3 (2005) got her wider recognition, and she has since starred in a number of films, most of which have won her praise rather than commercial success. She won two consecutive Filmfare Awards for Best Supporting Actress for her performances in Omkara (2006) and Life in a... Metro (2007), respectively. Her performance in the former won her a second National Award under the Best Supporting Actress category. She was the first recipient of the Best Actress award at the Filmfare Awards East for her work in the Bengali film Goynar Baksho (2014).
In 2017, her directorial debut film A Death in the Gunj was released and she won the Filmfare Award for Best Debut Director. In the same year she starred in Lipstick Under My Burkha, which won her numerous international awards.

Early life
Sen Sharma was born on 3 December 1979. Her father Mukul Sharma was a science writer and journalist and her mother Aparna Sen an actress and film director. She has an elder sister, Kamalini Chatterjee. Sen Sharma's maternal grandfather, Chidananda Dasgupta, was a film critic, scholar, professor, writer and one of the co-founders of the Calcutta Film Society. Her grandmother Supriya Dasgupta was a cousin of legendary modern Bengali poet Jibanananda Das.

Sen Sharma has a degree in English from St Stephen's College, Delhi, which she received in 2001. She was a student of the Modern High School for Girls.

Career
Sen Sharma made her debut as a child artist in the Bengali film Indira (1983). In 2000, she made her adult debut in the Bengali film Ek Je Aachhe Kanya, in which she played a negative character. It was followed by a role in Rituparno Ghosh's acclaimed film Titli, opposite Mithun Chakraborty and her mother Aparna Sen.

In 2001, she starred in the English-language film Mr. and Mrs. Iyer, directed by Aparna Sen. The film performed well mainly in multiplexes and was a major critical success. Sen Sharma's performance as a Tamil housewife and her mastery of the accent were received well and she was awarded the National Film Award for Best Actress. Her performance was later included in the 2010 issue of the "Top 80 Iconic Performances" by Filmfare.

This was followed by the National Film Award-winning social film, Page 3 (2005). Her role of a smart journalist drew praise and she became a more familiar face to the movie-going public.

Sen Sharma was offered the lead role in Mira Nair's Hollywood film, The Namesake (2007), but owing to clashing dates with other films, she could not commit to the project. However, she followed it with acclaimed performances as a mentally ill woman in 15 Park Avenue (2005) and as a middle aged village woman in Omkara (2006). For the latter, she received both the Filmfare Awards for Best Supporting Actress and the National Film Award for Best Supporting Actress. Her next release Deadline: Sirf 24 Ghante (2006) got average reviews. In 2006, Sen Sharma made her directorial debut with an 18-minute Bengali short film titled Naamkoron (Naming Ceremony) for the Kala Ghoda Film Festival.

Following this, Sen Sharma acted in Dosar, a Bengali art film by Rituporno Ghosh which was premiered at several international film festivals. She won the Best Actress award at Mahindra Indo-American Arts Council (MIAAC) Film Festival for her performance.

Her first release of 2007 was her second collaboration with Madhur Bhandarkar, a noir film named Traffic Signal, in which she played a street prostitute. Later that year, she appeared in Anurag Basu's Life in a... Metro. The film opened to positive reviews and performed well at the Indian box office. Metro depicted the lives of different individuals in Mumbai, and Sen Sharma's performance as a young and insecure woman earned her a second Filmfare Award for Best Supporting Actress.

In late 2007, Sen Sharma acted in 2 films under the Yash Raj Films banner. She noted her excitement toward these 2 projects as these were the first films in which she had to lip-sync for songs. In the first one, Laaga Chunari Mein Daag, a drama directed by Pradeep Sarkar, she portrayed a young woman from Banaras, Shubhavari 'Shubhi/Chutki' Sahay, alongside Rani Mukerji. The film was a critical and commercial failure in India, even though her performance was well received. The second one was Aaja Nachle, which was widely promoted as the comeback film of Madhuri Dixit. The film did not fare well critically and commercially. Rajeev Masand from CNN-IBN noted her performance in the film as being "...nothing short of fantastic. Her greatest strength is that she isn't afraid of making a fool of herself and she doesn't worry about being laughed at. As a result, her performance in Aaja Nachle is fearless and uninhibited."

In 2008, Sen Sharma starred in Dil Kabaddi. She starred in a short film (How Can It Be?) directed by Mira Nair for a movie project called 8, which was screened at several film festivals in 2008 before having a theatrical release.

In 2009, she appeared in the low-budget English-language film The President Is Coming, directed by Kunaal Roy Kapur, to generally positive reviews. Nikhat Kazmi from The Times of India wrote, "Performance-wise, it's the uptight and complex-ridden Ms. Sen Sharma who walks away with laurels and laughs even as the film takes a healthy snigger at the desi self."

Sen Sharma next starred in Zoya Akhtar's Luck by Chance, opposite Farhan Akhtar. Upon release, the film met with highly positive reviews from critics, as did her performance, but its financial income was modest. Sen Sharma's latest 2009 release was Ayan Mukerjee's coming-of-age comedy0drama Wake Up Sid in which she starred alongside Ranbir Kapoor. Upon release, the film received highly positive reviews, and her performance received rave reviews. Taran Adarsh of Bollywood Hungama wrote, "Sen Sharma is natural to the core and the best part is, she's so effortless. Here's another winning performance from this incredible performer!" The New York Times wrote, "Ms. Sharma has made a specialty of characters like Aisha: independent urban women, whose dreams involve careers as well as love. Her Aisha is a nuanced creation — ambitious, sympathetic, believable — and Mr. Mukerji, making his directing debut, is right to let her run away with the film."

In 2010, Sen Sharma starred in Ashwani Dheer's comedy Atithi Tum Kab Jaoge opposite Ajay Devgan and Paresh Rawal. and Neeraj Pathak's Right Yaa Wrong where she played a lawyer. She has completed shooting for Rituparno Ghosh's comedy film Sunglass and Vinay Shukla's Mirch.

In 2011, Sen Sharma played the leading role in Aparna Sen's Iti Mrinalini, reportedly a semi-autobiographical film directed by the acclaimed Indian director Aparna Sen, also Konkona's mother.  She will also appear in Amitabh Verma's Jackpot opposite Ranvir Shorey, in Suman Mukherjee's adaptation of Shesher Kobita and Goutam Ghose's Shunyo Awnko.

In 2013, Sen Sharma starred in Balaji Telefilms' Ek Thi Daayan, directed by newcomer Kannan Iyer and produced by Vishal Bhardwaj and Ekta Kapoor. The film also starred Emraan Hashmi, Kalki Koechlin and Huma Qureshi, and the film itself is inspired by the short story written by her father Mukul Sharma. She has also played a lead role in Aparna Sen's Goynar Baksho.

In 2015, Sharma starred in the Bengali film Kadombori as Tagore's sister-in-law and also played Lakshmi Das, the wife of Gour Hari Das – an Odisha freedom fighter who spent 32 years attempting to convince the government of his patriotism. In October, she played a character based on Nupur Talwar in Vishal Bhardwaj's film Talvar, regarding the 2008 Noida Double Murder case. The film premiered at the Toronto Film Festival to extensive critical acclaim for Sharma and her co-stars Irrfan Khan and Neeraj Kabi, and also became a sleeper hit in India. In the same year she played Nayantara in a short film, Nayantara's Necklace.

In 2016, Sharma worked on A.R. Murgadoss' film entitled Akira, where she was portrayed a cop alongside Sonakshi Sinha.

In 2017, her directorial debut A Death in the Gunj was released on 2 June 2017, which starred Vikrant Massey and Kalki Koechlin in pivotal roles. The film was critically acclaimed and won her the Best Director award in the New York Indian film festival and also in the MAMI film festival. In July, her long-awaited Lipstick Under My Burkha released, directed by Alankrita Srivastava. The film garnered positive reviews and did well at the box office too. Her next project, titled Scholarship, alongside Kalki Koechlin is in pre-production.

In 2021, Sen Sharma stars in the Amazon Prime web series Mumbai Diaries 26/11. Directed by Nikkhil Advani and produced by Emmay Entertainment, it also stars Mohit Raina, Tina Desai, and Shreya Dhanwanthary.

In 2022, Sen Sharma and actor Ronit Roy will share the screen together in the upcoming mystery movie Bioscope. Director Preetam Mukherjee will make the actors from Tollywood and Bollywood tie the knot.

Theatre
In June 2009, Sen Sharma starred onstage first time at Atul Kumar's The Blue Mug alongside Rajat Kapoor, Vinay Pathak, Ranvir Shorey and Sheeba Chadha. In 2010, the play was toured around the nation and abroad.

Personal life
Sen Sharma started dating actor and co-star Ranvir Shorey in 2007. The couple got married on 3 September 2010 in a private ceremony. The Times of India reported that Sen Sharma gave birth to her first child, Haroon, on 15 March 2011 at a South Mumbai hospital. Sen Sharma and Shorey announced their separation in September 2015. They still remain friends and share the custody of their son. The couple finally got divorced on 13 August 2020.

In March 2022, Sen Sharma said that she has always felt "gender neutral" and doesn't view herself as either a man or a woman, adding that gender is a taught concept that she doesn't relate to.

Filmography

Films

Acting roles

As filmmaker

Television & Web Series

Podcast & Audiobook

Discography

Awards and nominations

See also
 List of Indian film actresses
 List of Bengali actresses

References

External links

 
 
 

1979 births
Living people
Screenwriters from Kolkata
Actresses from Kolkata
Film directors from Kolkata
Women writers from West Bengal
Actresses from Delhi
Indian film actresses
Actresses in Bengali cinema
Indian women screenwriters
Indian women film directors
Bengal Film Journalists' Association Award winners
Actresses in Hindi cinema
Best Supporting Actress National Film Award winners
Delhi University alumni
St. Stephen's College, Delhi alumni
Kalakar Awards winners
Best Actress National Film Award winners
Filmfare Awards winners
Screen Awards winners
Hindi screenwriters
21st-century Indian actresses
21st-century Indian women writers
21st-century Indian dramatists and playwrights
21st-century Indian film directors
Child actresses in Bengali cinema
Zee Cine Awards winners
International Indian Film Academy Awards winners
21st-century Indian screenwriters
Indian non-binary actors
Non-binary writers